Phyllocnistis insignis is a moth of the family Gracillariidae, found throughout the United States (including Maine, Illinois, Ohio, Maryland, Michigan, Kentucky, Missouri, Texas, Georgia, Florida and California).

The hostplants for the species include Arnoglossum muehlenbergii, Erechtites hieracifolia, Prenanthes alba, and Packera aurea. They mine the leaves of their host plant. The mine has the form of a long, narrow, linear, winding mine on the upperside of the leaf.

References

External links
Bug Guide

Phyllocnistis
Endemic fauna of the United States
Moths of North America